"Demon" is a song by Korean-American singer, Jay Park. It was first released as a digital single on September 5, 2011 in South Korea, then as a digital single on iTunes on September 13, 2011 worldwide.

Background 
"Demon" was written and produced by Teddy Riley, originally meant for Michael Jackson. It is an OST song for the upcoming movie Hype Nation 3D starring Park as the main villain, "Darkness". The rap verse was written by Park himself. The song was first released in Korea, on various Korean digital music sites. It was then released worldwide on iTunes on September 13, 2011. The version of the song released on iTunes is slightly different, with better sound quality, different cover art, and emphasises more on Park's voice during the rap part.

Music video
The music video for "Demon" was filmed in August 2010 in South Korea. The music video was released on September 5, 2011 on YouTube, along with the single. The choreographer is Andrew Baterina, a member of MTV ABDC's runner-up SoReal Cru, who has also choreographed Park's "Abandoned". It stars Kim Sa-rang, fellow SidusHQ label mate, as the demon who tries to seduce Park. However, it actually took over a year to release the music video. Park himself commented on that, stating he had no control over the release of both the music video and the song, and didn't know himself when it was going to be released. He apologized on Twitter in both Korean and English for the low quality production of the music video.

Track listing

Release history

References

External links
 Official Website
  at SidusHQ 
 'Demon' Single Album on Yedang Company Official Website
 
 
 
 

2011 singles
Jay Park songs
Song recordings produced by Teddy Riley
Songs written by Teddy Riley
2011 songs